The 2009–10 Northeastern Huskies men's basketball team represented Northeastern University during the 2009–10 college basketball season. This was Bill Coen's fourth season as head coach at Northeastern. The Huskies competed in the Colonial Athletic Association and play their home games at Matthews Arena. They finished the season 20–13, 14–4 in CAA play to finish in second place. They lost in the semifinals of the 2010 CAA men's basketball tournament to William & Mary and were invited to play in the 2010 National Invitation Tournament where they lost in the first round to Connecticut.

Preseason
In the CAA preseason polls, released October 20 in Washington, DC, Northeastern was predicted to finish second in the CAA. Sr. guard/forward Matt Janning was selected to the preseason all conference first team and Sr. forward Manny Adako was selected the second team.

Roster
Source

Schedule and results
Source
All times are Eastern

|-
!colspan=9 style=| Regular season

|-
!colspan=10 style=| CAA tournament

|-
!colspan=10 style=| NIT

References

Northastern
Northeastern Huskies men's basketball seasons
Northeastern